Nakhl Taqi (also Romanized as Nakhl Taqī, Nakhl-e Taqī, Makhi-i-Taqi, Nakhl-i-Taqi, and Nakhl Takki; also known simply as Tagi) is a city in the Central District of Asaluyeh County, Bushehr province, Iran. At the 2006 census, its population was 7,818 in 1,574 households. The following census in 2011 counted 11,503 people in 2,433 households. The latest census in 2016 showed a population of 18,837 people in 4,632 households.

Language 
The linguistic composition of the city:

References 

Cities in Bushehr Province
Populated places in Asaluyeh County